Catholic Charities is a network of charities with headquarters in Alexandria, Virginia. In 2005, Forbes magazine ranked it as the fifth largest charity in the United States in terms of total revenue. The organization serves millions of people a year, regardless of their religious, social, or economic backgrounds. In 2019, 12 million persons were served at more than 2600 locations. Next to the federal government, Catholic Charities is the largest US social-safety-net provider.

Catholic Charities USA is a member of Caritas Internationalis, an international federation of Catholic social service organizations. Catholic Charities USA is the national office of 167 local Catholic Charities agencies nationwide.

Founded in 1910 as the National Conference of Catholic Charities (NCCC), the organization changed its name in 1986 to Catholic Charities USA (CCUSA). CCUSA's president and CEO, Sister Donna Markham OP, Ph.D., is the first female president to lead CCUSA in the organization's 105-year history. She has held this position since 2015.

Their motto is "Working to reduce poverty in America". Their mission statement is "The mission of Catholic Charities is to provide service to people in need, to advocate for justice in social structures, and to call the entire church and other people of good will to do the same."

Services
Catholic Charities uses a variety of approaches to deal with poverty, providing basic needs to individuals and advocacy to address systemic poverty. Through its member agencies, Catholic Charities provides services to millions of people a year through activities such as housing, health care, and disaster relief. Some services are provided directly by member agencies; in other instances, in conjunction with other organizations. In 2017, Catholic Charities named Daisy "Estelle" Anderson Volunteer of the Year. Anderson has created layettes for more than 10,000 families over the past thirty years. This includes creating crib linens, clothing, toys and diapers for newborns in need.

The organization's archives are housed at The Catholic University of America.

Disaster relief

In 1990, the U.S. Conference of Catholic Bishops commissioned CCUSA to respond to disasters in the United States. Relief and recovery services are provided at the local level by Catholic Charities agencies across the country. These agencies provide critical services including emergency food, shelter, direct financial assistance, counseling, and support. CCUSA's Disaster Operations coordinates the Catholic Church's response to disasters in the United States and grants relief funds to local Catholic Charities agencies to support their relief efforts. Catholic Charities has responded to disasters across the country, including the attacks on September 11, Hurricanes Katrina and Rita, the Gulf Coast oil spill, and the impact of Superstorm Sandy.

Governance
Catholic Charities USA is governed by a Board of Trustees, many of whom are lead local Catholic Charities agencies across the country. There are 160 member organizations nationwide, nearly one per diocese.

Presidents
 Herman J. Lammers (1939–1976)
 J. Bryan Hehir (2001–2003)
 Larry J. Snyder (2005–2015)
 Donna Markham (2015–present)

Finances
Catholic Charities uses about 89% of its revenue for program costs. Catholic Charities is listed as an Accredited Charity by the Better Business Bureau Wise Giving Alliance.

In 2010, Catholic Charities had revenues of $4.7 billion, $2.9 billion of which came from the US government. About $140 million came from donations from diocesan churches, the remainder coming from in-kind contributions, investments, program fees, and community donations. The Catholic Charities of the Archdiocese of Washington holds a fundraising gala every year and raised $2.4 million in 2017.

History
In 1727, French Ursuline Sisters founded an orphanage in New Orleans, Louisiana, the first Catholic charitable institution in the area that later became the United States. During the nineteenth century, provision of Catholic charity was for the most part a local matter. However, the Society of Saint Vincent de Paul, which was organized in the United States in 1845 in St. Louis, Missouri, soon spread to other cities and dioceses. The SVDP Society held national meetings, which served as a point of contact for members working at the local level, and played a significant role in the formation of the National Conference of Catholic Charities.

By 1900, there were more than 800 Catholic institutions dedicated to the care of children, the elderly, the sick, and the disabled. According to Jack Hansan of the Social Welfare History Project, by 1910 about half of the approximately 15 million Catholics in the United States lived in poverty. Only three diocesan charity agencies were organized prior to 1910. The San Francisco earthquake of 1906 and ensuing fire prompted the Archdiocese of San Francisco to form Catholic Charities CYO the following year to assist destitute families and care for children who were orphaned by the disaster.

National Conference of Catholic Charities
On September 25, 1910, representatives of many service agencies met at The Catholic University of America at the invitation of its rector, Bishop Thomas J. Shahan, and formed the National Conference of Catholic Charities (NCCC) to support and coordinate their efforts. They held their final meeting at the White House at the invitation of President Taft.

The new organization drew its inspiration from the social teachings of Pope Leo XII, whose Rerum novarum (1891), in one scholar's words, sought to "free [the Church] from paralyzing resistance to bourgeois civilization by shifting attention from the intractable problems of church and state to the social question, where a more flexible pastoral and evangelical approach might be possible." The organization's founding also paralleled the development of social work as a profession and the increasing cooperation among sectarian charitable organizations. Msgr. William J. Kerby, the first executive director of NCCC, described the problems a few years later: "The intense individualism of institutional and geographical units of the Church's life has ... led to a variety and resourcefulness that have been admirable. But it has resulted in a mutual independence and lack of coordination that have undoubtedly interfered with progress in certain ways...." Several Catholic educational institutions established social work programs in the decade after the founding of the NCCC, beginning with Loyola of Chicago (1914) and Fordham (1916).

In 1917, the NCCC established the Catholic Charities Review to provide a forum for the exchange of ideas and theories, and a resource for those who could not attend meetings. Catholic Charities Review was the successor publication to the Vincentians’ Quarterly.

Monsignor John O'Grady, a native of Ireland, worked alongside Kerby for several years. When Kerby stepped down as Executive Secretary in 1920, O'Grady became his successor. O'Grady became acquainted with Jane Addams, founder of Hull House, while studying in Chicago. Under his leadership, by 1931 there were fifty-eight diocesan organization functioning. Diocesan agencies began to expand their activities from dealing almost exclusively with the care of children to addressing wider issues of family welfare. The greatest challenge of O'Grady's tenure was the Great Depression. He served forty years as executive director and frequently spoke for the organization on matters of public policy. He supported the Social Security Act of 1935 and federal housing legislation. O'Grady fought against passage of the McCarran–Walter Act. The bill restricted immigration into the U.S., making it more difficult for World War II refugees to enter the United States. O'Grady said that the bill, which continued a national quota system that favored immigrants from Western European nations, "perpetuates the doctrine of Nordic superiority."

In March 1949, O'Grady, executive secretary of NCCC, testified before the House Ways and Means Committee in opposition to legislation proposed by the Truman administration that would have created a program of federal grants to support state relief and welfare programs. He said: "It envisages a complete governmental program that will virtually take over the entire field of child welfare. How can we maintain our spirit of Christian charity, our spirit of brotherhood, without the appeal of the great charitable institutions for the care of children?" He said it would "bring the Federal Government with all its rules and regulations into every community in the United States to set up governmental programs for the care of children" and that the legislation implied "national control over family life". He believed that some states were legally prohibited from purchasing services from religious organizations, and cited Pennsylvania as one where "Catholic and other religious childcare programs would be practically wiped out." In April, NCCC opposed Truman's proposed national health insurance program as well, and both measures were defeated. In September 1952, Truman appointed O'Grady to the President's Commission on Immigration and Naturalization.

1980s to present
Pope John Paul II addressed the national conference of Catholic Charities USA in San Antonio, Texas, on September 14, 1987. His call for increased efforts on behalf of the poor and "to reform structures which cause or perpetuate their oppression" prompted coverage of the organization's activism, including, according to the New York Times, "a wide range of projects in antipoverty, legal aid, voter registration, housing and community organization."

During the 2012 debate over the Patient Protection and Affordable Care Act, Catholic Charities USA was among the Catholic groups that expressed support for the Obama administration's efforts to address religious objections to some features of its implementation, even as the National Conference of Catholic Bishops opposed the administration's proposals as part of a larger government attack on religious liberty. Several diocesan branches of Catholic Charities participated in a lawsuit against provisions related to birth control insurance coverage, but not the national organization.

Catholic Charities USA has endorsed the DREAM Act and the Obama administration's deferral of action against some younger immigrants. Catholic Charities sponsors efforts to reduce homelessness in the United States, with cooperation with state and local government. In Saint Paul, Minnesota, Catholic Charities manages the Dorothy Day homeless shelter as well as the Higher Ground Saint Paul Shelter which provides shelter drop-in meals and career services.

Controversies

Boston
Between about 1985 and 1995, Catholic Charities of Boston, which contracted with the state's Department of Social Services and accepted state funds in support of their adoption services program, placed 13 children with gay couples out of 720 adoptions. Catholic Charities President Rev. J. Bryan Hehir explained the practice: "If we could design the system ourselves, we would not participate in adoptions to gay couples, but we can't. We have to balance various goods." The agency had never sought an exemption from the state's anti-discrimination statute, which had taken effect in 1989.

In December 2005, the lay-dominated board of Catholic Charities of Boston voted unanimously to continue gay adoptions. On February 28, 2006, Archbishop Seán P. O'Malley and Hehir met with Governor Mitt Romney to make the case for an exemption from the state's non-discrimination statute, but Romney told them he was unable to help. They considered and rejected the idea of a lawsuit. On March 10, O'Malley and leaders of Catholic Charities of the Archdiocese of Boston announced that the agency would terminate its adoption work effective June 30, rather than continue to place children under the guardianship of homosexuals. The statement did not distinguish between gay and lesbian individuals and those in same-sex relationships. Hehir said "This is a difficult and sad day for Catholic Charities. We have been doing adoptions for more than 100 years."

Washington, D.C.
In November 2009, Archbishop Donald Wuerl wrote that he recognized that Washington, D.C., officials were intent on legalizing same-sex marriage, but asked for stronger language to protect individuals and institutions with religious objections to the policy. He wrote that "Despite the headlines, there has been no threat or ultimatum to end services" and explained that Catholic Charities had contracts with the District to provide "homeless services, mental health services, foster care and more".<ref>Washington Post: Donald W. Wuerl, "Archbishop Donald Wuerl on D.C.'s same-sex marriage bill", November 22, 2009, accessed February 24, 2012</ref> The law legalizing same-sex marriage passed in December 2009 with the first marriages set to occur on March 9, 2010. Faced with the law's requirements, Catholic Charities in D.C. decided to stop providing health benefits to employees' spouses rather than provide them to married same-sex couples as well. Spouses already enrolled in the plan were not affected.

Illinois
In March 2011, after Lutheran Child and Family Services denied a gay couple a foster care license, the Chicago Tribune'' reported that Illinois officials were investigating whether religious agencies that received public funds were breaking anti-discrimination laws if they turned down applications from gay parents. In Illinois, adults who adopt or become foster care providers must obtain a foster care license from one of 57 private child welfare agencies or directly from the Department of Children and Family Services. According to Kendall Marlowe, spokesperson for DCFS, the matter probably had not emerged before because openly gay candidates chose agencies that did not have restrictive policies.

In May 2011 Catholic Charities of Rockford announced that it would halt its foster care and adoption services "to avoid liability if state law requires them to place children with parents in civil unions — either gay or straight". In June 2011 Catholic Charities in the dioceses of Springfield, Peoria and Joliet went to court to seek declaratory relief that would protect religious agencies from legal action if they turn away couples in civil unions seeking to adopt. Catholic Charities asked the court's permission to refer civil union couples to other child welfare agencies while continuing to issue licenses to married couples and singles living alone, while adhering to principles that prohibit placing children with unmarried cohabiting couples.

Following the legalization of same-sex civil unions effective June 1, 2011, Illinois required Catholic Charities, because it accepted public funds, to provide adoption and foster-care services to same-sex couples just as they serviced different-sex couples. When Illinois declined to renew its contracts with Catholic Charities for adoption and foster care services, Catholic Charities closed most of its Illinois affiliates. They had provided such services for 40 years.

See also
 Catholic charities
 Catholic Relief Services
 Catholic Campaign for Human Development
 Catholic Charities of the Archdiocese of Chicago
 Society of Saint Vincent de Paul

Notes

References

External links
 Catholic Charities website
 Archives inventory
 Hansan, Jack. "Catholic Charities USA", Social Welfare History Project

Catholic Church in the United States
Social welfare charities based in the United States
1910 establishments in California
Organizations established in 1910